Phillip Gwynne (born 1958) is an Australian author. He is best known for his 1998 debut novel, Deadly, Unna?, a rites-of-passage story which uses Australian rules football as a backdrop to explore race relations in a small town in South Australia. The novel won several awards, selling over 200,000 copies, and was adapted into a 2002 film titled Australian Rules. Gwynne has written numerous other books, including children's and young adult books as well as screenplays for television and movies.

Life
Gwynne was born in Melbourne, Victoria, and grew up in rural areas in Victoria and South Australia. He graduated from James Cook University with a degree in marine biology. He also pursued a career as a computer programmer. He came to professional writing later in life and wrote his first novel at the age of 35. His award-winning novel Deadly Unna won Children's Book of the Year in 1998 and was made into a feature film Australian Rules in 2002. Deadly Unna also won him the 1999 Children's Peace Literature Award.

Works
Young adult
Deadly, Unna? (1998)
Nukkin Ya (2000)
Jetty Rats (2004)
Swerve (2009)
 The Debt book 1: Catch the Zolt (2013)
 The Debt book 2: Turn off the Lights (2013)
The Debt book 3: Bring Back Cerberus (2013)
 The Debt book 4: Fetch the Treasure Hunter (2013)
The Debt book 5: Yamashita's Gold (2013)
The Debt book 6: Take a Life (2013)

Children's books
The Worst Team Ever (1999)
Born to Bake (2005)
A Chook Called Harry (2009)
Escape from Kids' Club (2010)
Ruby Learns to Swim (2012)
The Queen with the Wobbly Bottom (2012)
Yobbos Do Yoga (2013)
What's Wrong with the Wobbegong? (2014)
Michael (2014)
Little Owl (2014)
Small Town (2020)

References

1958 births
20th-century Australian novelists
21st-century Australian novelists
Australian children's writers
Australian male novelists
People from Melbourne
James Cook University alumni
Living people
20th-century Australian male writers
21st-century Australian male writers